An American Crime is a 2007 American crime horror drama film directed by Tommy O'Haver and starring Elliot Page and Catherine Keener. The film is based on the true story of the torture and murder of Sylvia Likens by Indianapolis single mother Gertrude Baniszewski. It premiered at the 2007 Sundance Film Festival.

Because of internal problems with the film's original distributor, First Look International, the film was not released theatrically. The Showtime television network officially premiered An American Crime on May 10, 2008. The film was nominated for a Golden Globe, a Primetime Emmy (both for Keener's performance), and a Writers Guild of America Award.

Plot
In 1965, sixteen-year-old Sylvia Likens and her disabled fifteen-year-old sister, Jenny, are left in the care of an impoverished woman named Gertrude Baniszewski, a church acquaintance and mother to Paula, Johnny, Stephanie, and several younger children. Sylvia and Jenny's parents, Lester and Betty, work in the carnival circuit and leave on a tour. Gertrude agrees to take care of Sylvia and Jenny for a fee of $20 per week.

Lester's payment fails to arrive. Infuriated, Gertrude whips the Likens sisters with a belt. When the payment arrives with a letter from the parents, Gertrude discards the letter without telling the sisters. After Sylvia tells Paula's boyfriend about Paula's pregnancy, Gertrude forces Sylvia to apologize for "spreading lies" and has Johnny help Paula beat Sylvia until she complies. Jenny discovers the letter from their parents in the trash. Sylvia telephones them, but she is seen by the Baniszewski children. Gertrude falsely accuses them of stealing money from her for the call and burns Sylvia with a cigarette. She also accuses Sylvia of flirting with Andy, father of one of Gertrude's sons. She sexually abuses Sylvia and orders Johnny and Stephanie's boyfriend, Coy Hubbard, to push her down the basement stairs. As Jenny weeps, Gertrude says Sylvia will remain in the basement "until she learns her lesson".

Gertrude instructs her children to lie that Sylvia was sent to juvenile detention. With Gertrude's knowledge and approval, Johnny regularly invites the neighborhood children to the basement to abuse Sylvia. Paula soon feels guilty and tells her mother Sylvia has been punished enough. Gertrude ignores Paula, reminding her that there is blood on her hands as well. The Reverend arrives, hinting that Paula has confessed about her pregnancy and Sylvia's treatment. Gertrude lies to him that Sylvia was sent away. Once the Reverend leaves, Gertrude orders everyone into the basement, where she restrains Sylvia and begins branding the words "I'M A PROSTITUTE AND PROUD OF IT" on her stomach with a heated needle. Gertrude passes the needle to her teen neighbor Ricky Hobbs to finish the branding.

That night, Paula helps an injured Sylvia escape from the basement. Gertrude is awakened by another daughter and tries to catch Sylvia, but she is stopped by Paula. Ricky drives Sylvia to her parents. They are horrified by Sylvia's condition and drive her back to the Baniszewski house at her request to make sure Jenny is okay. When Sylvia enters, she sees a distraught Stephanie trying to revive Sylvia with Ricky's help, but to no avail, indicating that the entire escape and reunion with her parents had been a hallucination. Sylvia soon dies in the arms of Stephanie and Ricky, after which Gertrude declares that all sexual desire on Sylvia's part has come to an end and Jenny must now act as her family's servant from that time on.

Once the police arrive, Jenny agrees to testify in court in exchange for her freedom. At the murder trial, Jenny says Gertrude threatened her with the same treatment if she told anyone; Gertrude tries to frame her children and their friends for Sylvia's death. However, her attempts to frame all her witnesses backfire as she is sentenced to life in prison for first-degree murder and child abuse. Sylvia's voice narrates the fates of her other murderers. Gertrude, in her prison cell, briefly sees Sylvia's ghost.

Cast

 Elliot Page as Sylvia Likens
 Catherine Keener as Gertrude Baniszewski
 Hayley McFarland as Jenny Fay Likens
 Ari Graynor as Paula Baniszewski
 Nick Searcy as Lester Likens
 Romy Rosemont as Betty Likens
 Evan Peters as Ricky Hobbs
 James Franco as Andy Gordon
 Brian Geraghty as Bradley
 Michael Welch as Teddy Lewis
 Scott Reeves as Eric
 Jeremy Sumpter as Coy Hubbard
 Scout Taylor-Compton as Stephanie Baniszewski
 Tristan Jarred as Johnny Baniszewski
 Hannah Leigh Dworkin as Shirley Baniszewski
 Carlie Westerman as Marie Baniszewski
 Bradley Whitford as Prosecutor Leroy K. New
 Michael O'Keefe as Reverend Bill Collier

Production
Principal photography took place in 2006. Most of the cast were completely unaware of the real Likens murder until after they read the script, which was based largely on actual court transcripts from the case. Catherine Keener originally turned down the role of Gertrude Baniszewski; however, after she could not get the story out of her head, she met with director Tommy O'Haver and agreed to do the film. Elliot Page was the only choice to play Sylvia Likens.

Critical reception
Review aggregator website Rotten Tomatoes reports that 43% of 14 critic reviews are positive for the film, with an average rating of 4.8/10. Ginia Bellafante of The New York Times called it "one of the best television movies to appear in years" and praised Catherine Keener's portrayal of Gertrude Baniszewski.

See also 
 The Girl Next Door, another film loosely based on the Likens case, released in the same year.

Notes

References

External links
 2007 New York Times interview with director Tommy O'Haver

Tommy O'Haver's An American Crime blog

2007 films
2000s English-language films
2007 crime drama films
2007 horror films
2000s American films
American biographical films
American courtroom films
American crime drama films
American psychological horror films
Crime films based on actual events
Drama films based on actual events
Films about child abuse
Films about families
Films directed by Tommy O'Haver
Films produced by Christine Vachon
Films scored by Alan Lazar
Films set in 1965
Films set in 1966
Films set in Indianapolis
Horror films based on actual events
Killer Films films
Torture in films